Geoffrey Richard Gollop, OBE (born 23 February 1955) is a British Conservative politician, the deputy mayor of Bristol, the former lord mayor of Bristol, and the former deputy lord mayor of Bristol. He was the Conservative candidate for the first directly elected mayor of Bristol in 2012.

Personal life 
Gollop was born at Bristol Maternity Hospital and has lived his entire life in Bristol, having been brought up in Henbury, where he attended Blaise Primary School. He then attended Clifton College, and after that went up to Fitzwilliam College, Cambridge. Thereafter he trained in accounting, became a Chartered Accountant and worked in accounting firms, before being made redundant and setting up his own business. Geoff Gollop & Co merged with accounting firm Milsted Langdon in 2013, with Gollop joining the latter as a director.

Gollop is married to Bernice and has two children, Mark and Hermione. He is a Methodist and supports Bristol Rovers F.C. and Bristol City F.C. His other interests include musical theatre and travel. He joined the Conservative Party in 1973. He is a former school governor of Henbury School and Henleaze Junior School, and a former church warden of St Mary's Church, Henbury.

In November 2011, Gollop was the victim of an arson attack on his car, for which the Informal Anarchist Federation claimed responsibility.

Political career 
Gollop was inspired to enter local politics by the issue of secondary education and by his father Philip, a former Councillor for the Henbury ward, and he has been a Conservative Councillor on Bristol City Council since June 2001, representing the Westbury-on-Trym ward.

In 2011, Gollop was appointed the lord mayor of Bristol, and in 2012 he was appointed the deputy lord mayor of Bristol. On 7 August 2012, he was selected to be the Conservative candidate for the first directly elected mayor of Bristol, having defeated former three-time lord mayor and Bristol City Council's Conservative group leader, Peter Abraham, and former councillor, Barbara Lewis. Receiving support from the mayor of London, Boris Johnson, Gollop campaigned on transport, education, inequality and Council culture. His specific policies included a freeze or reduction in Council Tax, lower fares on public transport, and business rates relief for independent shops. In the election on 15 November, Gollop lost to independent candidate George Ferguson, coming third, with 9.13% of the first-preference votes, behind Ferguson and the Labour Party candidate Marvin Rees. Gollop attributed the result to "a real disillusionment with party politics". After the election, Mayor Ferguson appointed Gollop as the deputy mayor of Bristol, and as the cabinet member with responsibility for finance and corporate services.

References 

1955 births
Alumni of Fitzwilliam College, Cambridge
Conservative Party (UK) councillors
Councillors in Bristol
English accountants
Businesspeople from Bristol
English Methodists
Living people
Mayors of Bristol
Officers of the Order of the British Empire
People educated at Clifton College
School governors
Survivors of terrorist attacks